Eddie Kendricks   is the third album by former Temptations vocalist Eddie Kendricks. It was released in the spring of 1973 on Tamla Records.

Reception

This was the breakthrough solo album Eddie Kendricks was looking for. Charting on the pop chart at number eighteen and number five on the R&B chart. This was his only solo album that would land in the top 20 on the pop chart. Includes the number-one pop and R&B single "Keep On Truckin'", which is one of the precursor to disco songs to come out before the explosion of the genre.

This album established Kendricks as the most successful member of the Temptations to go solo. He was the only former member of the group to have a number-one Hot 100 single.

Track listing

Side One
"Only Room for Two" (Don Daniels, Terri McFaddin)  3:02
"Darling Come Back Home" (Frank Wilson, Kathy Wakefield, King Errisson)  4:07 
"Each Day I Cry a Little" (Leonard Caston, Terri McFaddin)  7:14
"Can't Help What I Am" (Frank Wilson, Kathy Wakefield, Leonard Caston)  4:24

Side Two
"Keep On Truckin'" (Anita Poree, Frank Wilson, Leonard Caston)  8:02
"Any Day Now" (Bob Hilliard, Burt Bacharach)  5:09 
"Not on the Outside" (Larry Roberts, Sylvia Robinson)  4:35
"Where Do You Go (Baby)" (Gloria Jones, Pam Sawyer)  3:24

Personnel
Eddie Kendricks - lead and backing vocals
Darrell Clayborn, James Jamerson - bass	 	
Billy Cooper, Dean Parks, Greg Poree - guitar
Ed Greene, Kenny "Spider" Rice - drums
Gary Coleman, Jack Ashford - percussion, vibes
Harold Johnson - piano, organ
Leonard Caston Jr. - piano, organ, clavinet
King Errisson - congas
Lezli Valentine - backing vocals on "Not on the Outside"
Frank Wilson, James Anthony Carmichael, Leonard Caston Jr. - arrangements
Jerry Long - orchestration direction
Jim Britt - photography

Charts

Singles

References

External links
 Eddie Kendricks-Eddie Kendricks at Discogs

1973 albums
Eddie Kendricks albums
Tamla Records albums
Albums produced by Frank Wilson (musician)